Peter Gatkuoth (1 January 1938 – 26 August 2010) was a South Sudanese politician. Gatkuoth was the third president of the High Executive Council of the Southern Sudan Autonomous Region, serving from 12 July 1979 to 30 May 1980.

He was shot dead by Sergeant Gabriel Majur, a reported drug addict and alcoholic.

References

Presidents of South Sudan
1938 births
2010 deaths
South Sudanese murder victims
Assassinated South Sudanese politicians
People murdered in Sudan